Films produced in Spain in the 1950s ordered by year of release on separate pages:

List of films by year
Spanish films of 1950
Spanish films of 1951
Spanish films of 1952
Spanish films of 1953
Spanish films of 1954
Spanish films of 1955
Spanish films of 1956
Spanish films of 1957
Spanish films of 1958
Spanish films of 1959

External links
 Spanish film at the Internet Movie Database

Spanish
Films